Melissa Cándida "Missy" Doi (September 1, 1969 — September 11, 2001) was an American businesswoman in the financial industry who was a victim of the September 11 attacks on the World Trade Center.

She is known for the recording of the 9-1-1 call she made during her final moments from inside the South Tower as it was engulfed in flames. The recording was used during the prosecution of Zacarias Moussaoui, the only criminal trial to result from the attacks. Her emotional conversation with emergency operator Barnes made several international headlines.

Early life
Melissa was the only child of a single mother, Evelyn Alderete. Doi graduated from the Spence School, before attending Northwestern University, where she graduated in 1991 with a sociology degree and was a member of Delta Gamma sorority. She had ambitions to become a ballet dancer.

Death and 9-1-1 call recording

According to the 9-1-1 recording played during the trial of Zacarias Moussaoui, Melissa Doi made her call from the 83rd floor of the South Tower at 9:17 a.m., on September 11, 2001. When the South Tower of the World Trade Center was hit by United Airlines Flight 175 at 9:03 a.m., she and another five people were trapped in the impact zone on the 83rd floor where IQ Financial Systems was located when she called 911. During the call, the operator tries to keep Doi calm and extract information from her. She answered, "Well, there's no one here yet, and the floor's completely engulfed. We're on the floor and we can't breathe, And it's very, very, very hot".
Due to privacy reasons, only the first four minutes of the dispatch call, which lasted 24 minutes, was released by the courts along with the rest of the recordings, numbering more than 1,600. As the South Tower burned, she asked the operator, "Can you stay on the line with me, please? I feel like I'm dying."

Near the end of the call, Doi spells out the last name of her mother and asks the dispatcher to set up a three-way call so that she can speak to her mother one last time.
"We couldn't put her on," the dispatcher says. "We don't have a three-way system for that."
As smoke and heat began to overcome her, Doi gave the 911 operator her mother's name and phone number in hopes of passing on a last message. That evening, Alderete received a call from the 911 operator who had spoken with Doi while she was trapped in the stairwell, who said she had a message for Alderete from her daughter: "Tell my mother that I love her and that she's the best mom in the whole world." 
After  minutes, the call cuts off. It took three years for her remains to be found in the rubble. At the National 9/11 Memorial, Doi is memorialized at the South Pool, on Panel S-46.

Transcript of the 9-1-1 call
{| class="wikitable collapsible collapsed" style="min-width:40em"
! colspan=2 |Transcript of phone conversation
|-
! Speaker !! Transcript 
|- 
|
Melissa Doi
|  
(muttering to herself in distressed state) Holy Mary, Mother of God
|- 
|  
NYPD Dispatcher 8695
|  
8695, good morning. (unintelligible) Good day.
|- 
|  
unidentified
|  
Hi, what's your number again, please?
|- 
|  
911 Dispatcher 8695
|  
8-6-9-5.
|- 
|  
Melissa Doi
| 
Oh my God, I'm on the 83rd floor...
|-
|unidentified
|  
86-what?
|- 
|  
Melissa Doi
|  
I'm on the 83rd floor!
|- 
|  
unidentified
|  
Ma'am, stop that. 86-what?
|- 
|  
911 Dispatcher 8695
|  
8-6-9-5, 8-6-9-5. Get the World Trade Center... Someone's having difficulty breathing on the 83rd floor.
|- 
|  
911 Dispatcher 8695
|
Hi there ma'am, how are you doing?
|- 
|  
Melissa Doi
|  
Is it... Is it... Are they going to be able to get somebody up here?
|- 
|  
911 Dispatcher 8695
|
Well of course ma'am, we're coming up to you.
|- 
|  
Melissa Doi
|  
Well, there's no-one here yet, and the floor's completely engulfed. We're on the floor and we can't breathe.
|- 
|  
911 Dispatcher 8695
|
(unintelligible)
|- 
|  
Melissa Doi
|  
And it's very, very, very hot.
|-
|
911 Dispatcher 8695
|
It's very... Are the lights still on?
|- 
|  
Melissa Doi
|  
The lights are on, but it's very hot.
|- 
|  
911 Dispatcher 8695
|  
Ma'am, now ma'am...
|- 
|  
Melissa Doi
|  
VERY hot! We're all on the other side of Liberty, and it's very, very hot.
|- 
|  
911 Dispatcher 8695
|  
Well the lights, can you turn the lights off?
|-
|
 
Melissa Doi
|  
No, no. The lights are off.
|- 
|  
911 Dispatcher 8695
|
Okay good, now everybody stay calm, you're doing a good job...
|- 
|  
Melissa Doi
|  
Please!
|- 
|  
911 Dispatcher 8695
|
Ma'am listen, everybody's coming, everybody knows, everybody knows what happened, okay... They have to take time to come up there, you know that. You gotta be very careful. 
|- 
|  
Melissa Doi
|  
Very hot.
|-
|
911 Dispatcher 8695
|
I understand. You gotta to be very, very careful... How they approach you, okay? Now you stay calm. How many people where you’re at right now?
|- 
|  
Melissa Doi
|  
There's, like, five people here with me.
|- 
|  
911 Dispatcher 8695
|  
All up on the 83rd floor?
|- 
|  
Melissa Doi
|  
83rd floor.
|- 
|  
911 Dispatcher 8695
|  
With five people... Five patients... Everybody's having trouble breathing?
|- 
|  
Melissa Doi
|  
Everybody's having trouble breathing, some people are worse than others.
|- 
|  
911 Dispatcher 8695
|  
Anybody's unconscious, everybody's awake?
|- 
|  
Melissa Doi
|  
So far yes, but it's...
|- 
|  
911 Dispatcher 8695
|  
Listen, listen, everybody's awake?
|- 
|  
Melissa Doi
|  
Yes, so far.
|- 
|  
911 Dispatcher 8695
|  
Conscious? And it's very hot there, but no fire, right?
|- 
|  
Melissa Doi
|  
I can't see because it's too high.
|- 
|  
911 Dispatcher 8695
|  
No, no, very hot, no fire for now, and no smoke, right? No smoke, right?
|- 
|  
Melissa Doi
|  
OF COURSE THERE'S SMOKE!
|- 
|  
911 Dispatcher 8695
|  
Ma'am, ma'am, you have to stay calm.
|- 
|  
Melissa Doi
|  
There's smoke! I can't breathe!
|- 
|  
911 Dispatcher 8695
|  
Okay, stay calm with me, okay? I understand...
|- 
|  
Melissa Doi
|  
I think there's fire because it's very hot.
|- 
|  
911 Dispatcher 8695
|  
Okay, it's...
|- 
|  
Melissa Doi
|  
It's very hot, everywhere on the floor.
|- 
|  
911 Dispatcher 8695
|  
Okay, I know you don't see it and all, but I'm, I'm... (stumbles over words) I'm gonna, I'm documenting everything you say, okay? And it's very hot, you see no fire, but you see smoke, right?
|- 
|  
Melissa Doi
|  
It's very hot, I see... I don't see, I don't see any air anymore!
|- 
|  
911 Dispatcher 8695
|  
Okay.
|- 
|  
Melissa Doi
|  
All I see is smoke.
|- 
|  
911 Dispatcher 8695
|  
Okay dear, I'm so sorry, hold on for a sec, stay calm with me, stay calm. Listen, listen, the call is in, I'm documenting, hold on one second please...
|- 
|  
Melissa Doi
|  
I'm going to die, aren't I?
|- 
|  
911 Dispatcher 8695
|  
No, no, no, no, no, no, no, say your, ma'am, say your prayers.
|- 
|  
Melissa Doi
|  
I'm going to die.
|- 
|  
911 Dispatcher 8695
|  
You gotta think positive, because you gotta help each other get off the floor.
|- 
|  
Melissa Doi
|  
I'm going to die.
|- 
|  
911 Dispatcher 8695
|  
Now look, stay calm, stay calm, stay calm, stay calm.
|- 
|  
Melissa Doi
|  
Please, God...
|- 
|  
911 Dispatcher 8695
|  
You're doing a good job ma'am, you're doing a good job.
|- 
|  
Melissa Doi
|  
No, it's so hot I'm burning up.
|- 
|  
911 Dispatcher 8695
|  
Okay ma'am, the floor is hot, everything is hot, is there, are there, are there desks there? When you go up high, you get too close away from the smoke. Okay, I know you know. Hold on a second.
|- 
|  
911 Dispatcher 8695
|  
(into radio) 83rd floor, three people trapped.
|- 
|  
unidentified
|  
(into radio) Where?
|- 
|  
911 Dispatcher 8695
|  
(into radio) Way out on the 83rd floor, they're trapped, very hot... That's what I'm doing, just letting you know.|- 
|  
Melissa Doi
|  
(excited interrupting) Wait! Wait! We hear voices! (screaming to firefighters) HELP! HELP!
|- 
|  
911 Dispatcher 8695
|  
Hello, ma'am? Ma'am?
|- 
|  
Melissa Doi
|  
(screaming to firefighters) HEEEEELP
|- 
|  
911 Dispatcher 8695
|  
Okay, stay calm, ma'am, ma'am.
|- 
|  
Melissa Doi
|  
(screaming to firefighters) HEEEEELP
|- 
|  
911 Dispatcher 8695
|  
Stay calm, stay calm, just don't move.
|- 
|  
Melissa Doi
|  
Oh my God...
|- 
|  
911 Dispatcher 8695
|  
They coming through to you now?
|- 
|  
Melissa Doi
|  
Find out if there's anybody here on the 83rd floor.
|- 
|  
911 Dispatcher 8695
|  
Ma'am, don't you worry, you stay on the phone with me and we'll...
|- 
|  
Melissa Doi
|  
Can you find out if there's anybody on the 83rd floor, because we thought we heard somebody!
|- 
|  
911 Dispatcher 8695
|  
Ma'am, now listen, excuse me, I already notified the lieutenant, okay?
|- 
|  unidentified|  
(garbled radio traffic)
|- 
|  
911 Dispatcher 8695
|  
I already notified the lieutenant that there's five people on the 83rd floor, very hot and smoky, so they won't overlook you, okay dear?
|- 
|  
Melissa Doi
|  
Can you... Can you...
|- 
|  
911 Dispatcher 8695
|  
I already did that, dear.
|- 
|  
Melissa Doi
|  
Stay on the line with me please, I feel like I'm dying.
|- 
|  
911 Dispatcher 8695
|  
Yes ma'am, I'm going to stay with you.
|- 
|  
Melissa Doi
|  
They're here?
|- 
|  
911 Dispatcher 8695
| 
Are they inside with you yet, dear?
|- 
|  
Melissa Doi
| 
No.
|- 
|  
911 Dispatcher 8695
| 
Okay, stay calm until they get inside.
|- 
|  
Melissa Doi
| 
Can you find out where they are?
|- 
|  
911 Dispatcher 8695
| 
Okay, stay calm, stay calm, stay calm until they get inside.
|- 
|  
Melissa Doi
| 
Can... (voice stops)
|- 
|  unidentified| 
(radio traffic between Dispatcher 8695 and an unknown)
|}

 In popular culture 
 The transcript of Doi's call to 9-1-1 is used as a motif in Mathew McIntosh's 2017 novel theMystery.doc.
 The transcript of Doi's call is referenced in Mitchell Zuckoff's 2019 account of the events of that day, titled Fall and Rise: The Story of 9/11.
 The 9-1-1 call can be heard at the beginning of the 2012 movie Zero Dark Thirty'' about the Osama Bin Laden assassination.

See also

September 11 attacks
Edna Cintron
Frank De Martini
Kevin Cosgrove
Betty Ong
List of tenants in Two World Trade Center

References

External links

 

1969 births
2001 deaths
American terrorism victims
Businesspeople from New York City
Northwestern University alumni
Terrorism deaths in New York (state)
Victims of the September 11 attacks
People from Throggs Neck, Bronx
People murdered in New York City
Spence School alumni
20th-century American businesspeople